Macrosamanea prancei is a species of flowering plant in the family Fabaceae. It is found only in Brazil.

References

prancei
Flora of Brazil
Vulnerable plants
Taxonomy articles created by Polbot